A Let's Play is a type of video game walkthrough with commentary. The term may also refer to:

TV and gaming
 LetsPlay, a YouTube channel run by Rooster Teeth
 Let's Play (TV series), a children's television series broadcast on CBeebies 
 "Let's Play!", an episode of Desperate Housewives
 Let's Play (1931 film), comedy short with Slim Summerville and Tom Kennedy

Music
Let's Play (album), a 1991 album by Larry Willis
 Let's Play!, a 2002 children's music album by Raffi
 Let Us Play!, a 1997 album by Coldcut
 "Let's Play", a song and single by Kristina Maria